Veretye is a rural locality (a village) in Myaksinskoye Rural Settlement, Cherepovetsky District, Vologda Oblast, Russia. The population was 2 as of 2002.

Geography 
Veretye is located 108 km south of Cherepovets (the district's administrative centre) by road.

References 

Rural localities in Cherepovetsky District